The Ulansuhai Formation is a geological formation in Inner Mongolia, north China. Dinosaur remains are among the fossils that have been recovered from the formation.

The Ulansuhai Formation has traditionally been considered to date to the Aptian-Albian stages of the Lower Cretaceous, due to similarities between the Ulansuhai fauna and known Aptian formations. However, radiometric dating done on underlying formations has shown this to be incorrect. Due to the age of underlying rocks, the Ulansuhai Formation cannot be older than the Turonian stage of the Late Cretaceous, about 92 Ma.

Fossil content

Dinosaurs

Testudines

Ostracods

See also
 List of dinosaur-bearing rock formations

References 

Geologic formations of China
Upper Cretaceous Series of Asia
Cretaceous China
Turonian Stage
Paleontology in Inner Mongolia